Gebo is a ghost town located in Hot Springs County in the U.S. state of Wyoming.

The town was established as a coal town in 1907 alongside the nearby camps of Crosby and Kirby. It was named after Samuel Wilford Gebo who established the Owl Creek Coal Company and the first mine in the area after immigrating to America from Canada. Mining remained active until 1938.  At its height, over 2,000 people lived in the area, mostly miners and their families, making Gebo briefly the largest town in the county.

The remains of the town were bulldozed in 1971, though some buildings and the cemetery remain.

See also
Gebo, Montana

References

Geography of Hot Springs County, Wyoming
Ghost towns in Wyoming
Coal towns in Wyoming